Christine Pietzner was a New Zealand netball player who played for her country on 21 occasions.

Netball career
Christine Pietzner (née Cottrell) was born on 16 November 1949. Her brother was Wayne Cottrell, a rugby union player who played for the All Blacks. Her son, Jason, also became a rugby union player, playing over 300 times for the team in Lincoln, New Zealand.

Pietzner played netball for the Canterbury region. She was selected to play for the Silver Ferns, the New Zealand national netball team, in 1974 and made her debut on 15 October 1974 against Singapore, en route to a tour of England, where New Zealand were unbeaten. In 1975 she was selected for the Silver Ferns team to take part in the world championships, which were held in Auckland, New Zealand, with New Zealand finishing in third place. She was also in the team for the 1979 Netball World Championships, which were held in Port of Spain in Trinidad and Tobago, with New Zealand, Australia and the hosts finishing in a three-way tie. In her career, Pietzner played in the Wing attack (WA), Wing defence (WD) and Centre (C) positions.

References

1949 births
Living people
New Zealand international netball players
1975 World Netball Championships players
1979 World Netball Championships players